The men's tournament of volleyball at the 2019 Pan American Games in Lima, Peru take place from July 31 to August 4. All games are held at the Callao Sports Center. The defending champions is Argentina.

Qualification
A total of eight men's teams qualified to compete at the games. Peru automatically qualified as hosts and five other teams qualified based on their final rank (top five) at the 2018 Men's Pan-American Volleyball Cup regardless of their continental confederation, NORCECA or CSV. The last two berths (one for NORCECA and one for CSV) should have been awarded in qualification tournaments by each confederation or assigned directly, however, qualification tournaments were not held and each confederation assigned its berth directly.

Qualified teams

Results

Preliminary round

Group A

Group B

Placement 5th–8th

7th–8th place match

5th–6th place match

Placement 1st–4th

Semifinals

Bronze medal match

Gold medal match

Final standings

Awards

Most Valuable Player

Best Setter

Best Outside Hitters

Best Middle Blockers

Best Opposite

Best Libero

Medalists

References 

Volleyball at the 2019 Pan American Games
Pan American Games - Men